An oxyanion hole is a pocket in the active site of an enzyme that stabilizes transition state negative charge on a deprotonated oxygen or alkoxide. The pocket typically consists of backbone amides or positively charged residues. Stabilising the transition state lowers the activation energy necessary for the reaction, and so promotes catalysis. For example, proteases such as chymotrypsin contain an oxyanion hole to stabilise the tetrahedral intermediate anion formed during proteolysis and protects substrate's negatively charged oxygen from water molecules. Additionally, it may allow for insertion or positioning of a substrate, which would suffer from steric hindrance if it could not occupy the hole (such as BPG in hemoglobin). Enzymes that catalyse multi-step reactions can have multiple oxyanion holes that stabilise different transition states in the reaction.

See also
 Enzyme catalysis
 Active site
 Transition state
 Serine proteases#Catalytic mechanism

References

Enzymes
Protein structure